David Berry (December 11, 1921 – April 16, 2007) was a Canadian football player who played for the Calgary Stampeders and Winnipeg Blue Bombers. He won the Grey Cup with the Stampeders in 1948. Berry was born in Birkenhead, England and raised in Winnipeg, Manitoba. He was a veteran of World War II, serving in the Royal Canadian Air Force. He died in 2007.

References

1921 births
2007 deaths
Calgary Stampeders players
Royal Canadian Air Force personnel of World War II
Winnipeg Blue Bombers players